Pinarocorys is a genus of larks in the family Alaudidae.

Species
It contains two species:

References

 
Bird genera
Taxa named by George Ernest Shelley
Taxonomy articles created by Polbot